The Fairfax County Sheriff's Office, officially the Fairfax County Office of the Sheriff, serves a population of 1,116,897 residents in Fairfax County, Virginia, a Northern Virginian suburb of Washington, D.C. It is one of the largest Sheriff's Office in Virginia with nearly 600 sworn deputies.  The Sheriff and her deputies are fully sworn law enforcement officers with full arrest powers within Fairfax County, City of Fairfax and the Towns of Herndon and Vienna.  The Sheriff's Office assists the Fairfax County Police Department and other law enforcement agencies to maintain peace and order in Fairfax County.

History
The Sheriff's Office was formed in 1742 when Fairfax County was created from Prince William County, Virginia. The sheriff is a position established under the Virginia Constitution. The sheriff is elected every four years. There have been 70 elected sheriffs in Fairfax County.  the current Sheriff is Stacey Kincaid, who was first elected in a 2013 special election, and is the county's first woman sheriff.

The Fairfax County Sheriff's Office responsibilities have changed since its inception. It was the primary law enforcement agency in the county until 1940. That year Sheriff Eppa P. Kirby persuaded the Virginia General Assembly to separate the law enforcement role of the county police from the Sheriff's Office. On July 1, 1940, the Fairfax County Police Department became a separate agency under the control of Board of Supervisors.

In 2015, Natasha McKenna died in the Fairfax County Jail after corrections officers tasered her during transport.

See also

 List of law enforcement agencies in Virginia
 Fairfax County Police Department

References

External links

County sheriffs' offices of Virginia
Government in Fairfax County, Virginia
Organizations established in 1742
1742 establishments in Virginia